Terence Yung (born Hong Kong, China) is a classical pianist.

Education

At the age of five, Yung was found playing melodies by ear. Yung, who grew up in the United States, studied privately with Eleanor Sokoloff of the Curtis Institute of Music. He later trained at the Juilliard School pre-college program in New York City, where he was a scholarship student of Frank Lévy. He continued his studies with Abbey Simon at the University of Houston in Texas on a music scholarship and Pell grant. While at the university, he taught students from families of extreme poverty at the Yellowstone Academy in the Third Ward part of Houston as part of its urban outreach initiatives. He graduated in 2012 with a Bachelor of Arts from the Department of English and a Bachelor of Music from the Moores School of Music, taking summer courses at the neighboring Houston Community College. He also took lessons with Garrick Ohlsson and Philippe Entremont.

Upon graduation from college, he worked as a translator and for a law firm in the Philadelphia metro area. Yung attended the University of Texas School of Law in Austin, Texas.

Music career

Yung has appeared as a recitalist, chamber-musician, and soloist with orchestras throughout the United States including performances in Philadelphia, New York City, Seattle, and Houston, as well as abroad in Spain and France. He made his first public appearance at the age of 6. At age 11, he was asked to perform Beethoven's "Waldstein" Sonata at the Kimmel Center for the Performing Arts' Master Class Series. At age 13, he made his professional début with the Delaware Symphony Orchestra at the Grand Opera House Youth Concert Series.

Notable venues include the Kimmel Center in Philadelphia, the Teatro de Puigcerdá, the Grand Opera House in Delaware, Benaroya Hall, Yamaha Salon, Steinway Hall in New York City, the Kosciuszko Foundation, and the Museum of Fine Arts in Houston. He has also appeared at a number of international music festivals including the Puigcerdá International Music Festival, the International Keyboard Institute and Festival at Mannes College, the Seattle International Piano Festival, and the International Piano Festival in Houston. His recordings and interviews have been broadcast by radio and television throughout the United States and abroad.

Yung has been the subject of a number of interviews by  Ming Pao Daily News and Global Chinese Times as well as French Public News as an outstanding young talent from Hong Kong.  Mr. Yung has been an advocate for the education and outreach of classical music. He is affiliated with Sing For Hope, volunteering with its Healing Arts initiative to bring the gift of music to doctors and patients at the Mount Sinai Hospital in New York City.

In 2010, Yung was selected as a Young Steinway Artist.

Personal life

He made headlines when he pled guilty to cyberstalking an admissions interviewer after being rejected from Georgetown Law. His actions included publishing online ads directing people interested in violent sexual activity to the victim's house. He was sentenced to 46 months in jail for the incident.

References

External links

American classical pianists
Male classical pianists
American male pianists
Classical pianists from Hong Kong
Texas classical music
Juilliard School alumni
Living people
University of Houston alumni
21st-century classical pianists
21st-century American male musicians
21st-century American pianists
Year of birth missing (living people)